Jiaba is a small town in Longshan County, Xiangxi Tujia and Miao Autonomous Prefecture, Hunan province, China.

See also 
 List of township-level divisions of Hunan

References

Longshan County
Towns of Xiangxi Tujia and Miao Autonomous Prefecture